Mark Withers (born June 25, 1947, in Binghamton, New York) is an American actor, best known for his roles on television.

His most prominent role is probably Ted Dinard, the ill-fated gay lover of Steven Carrington (played by Al Corley) during the 1981 first season of the prime-time soap opera Dynasty.

Other television credits include: Wonder Woman, The Greatest American Hero, Magnum P.I., The Dukes of Hazzard, Hart to Hart, Remington Steele, Hotel, Dallas, L.A. Law, Matlock, The King of Queens and Frasier.

References

External links
 

1947 births
Living people
American male television actors
American male film actors
Actors from Binghamton, New York